In algebraic geometry, a morphism  between schemes is said to be smooth if
(i) it is locally of finite presentation
(ii) it is flat, and
(iii) for every geometric point  the fiber  is regular.
(iii) means that each geometric fiber of f is a nonsingular variety (if it is separated). Thus, intuitively speaking, a smooth morphism gives a flat family of nonsingular varieties.

If S is the spectrum of an algebraically closed field and f is of finite type, then one recovers the definition of a nonsingular variety.

Equivalent definitions
There are many equivalent definitions of a smooth morphism. Let  be locally of finite presentation. Then the following are equivalent.
 f is smooth.
 f is formally smooth (see below).
 Locally, f factors into  where g is étale.
 Locally, f factors into  where g is étale.

A morphism of finite type is étale if and only if it is smooth and quasi-finite.

A smooth morphism is stable under base change and composition.

A smooth morphism is universally locally acyclic.

Examples 
Smooth morphisms are supposed to geometrically correspond to smooth submersions in differential geometry; that is, they are smooth locally trivial fibrations over some base space (by Ehresmann's theorem).

Smooth Morphism to a Point 
Let  be the morphism of schemes

It is smooth because of the Jacobian condition: the Jacobian matrix

vanishes at the points  which has an empty intersection with the polynomial, since

which are both non-zero.

Trivial Fibrations 
Given a smooth scheme  the projection morphism 

is smooth.

Vector Bundles 
Every vector bundle  over a scheme is a smooth morphism.

sending

Notice that the direct sum bundles  can be constructed using the fiber product

Separable Field Extensions
Recall that a field extension  is called separable iff given a presentation

we have that . We can reinterpret this definition in terms of Kähler differentials as follows: the field extension is separable iff

Notice that this includes every perfect field: finite fields and fields of characteristic 0.

Non-Examples

Singular Varieties
For example, consider the affine cone of a quintic -fold given by

Then the Jacobian matrix is given by

which vanishes at the origin, hence the cone is singular. Affine hypersurfaces like these are popular in singularity theory because of their relatively simple algebra but rich  underlying structures.

Another example of a singular variety is the projective cone of a smooth variety: given a smooth projective variety  its projective cone is the union of all lines in  intersecting . For example, the projective cone of the points

is the scheme

If we look in the  chart this is the scheme

and project it down to the affine line , this is a family of four points degenerating at the origin. The non-singularity of this scheme can also be checked using the Jacobian condition.

Degenerating Families
Consider the flat family

Then the fibers are all smooth except for the point at the origin. Since smoothness is stable under base-change, this family is not smooth.

Non-Separable Field Extensions
For example, the field  is non-separable, hence the associated morphism of schemes is not smooth. If we look at the minimal polynomial of the field extension,

then , hence the Kähler differentials will be non-zero.

Formally smooth morphism 

One can define smoothness without reference to geometry. We say that an S-scheme X is formally smooth if for any affine S-scheme T and a subscheme  of T given by a nilpotent ideal,  is surjective where we wrote . Then a morphism locally of  finite type is smooth if and only if it is formally smooth.

In the definition of "formally smooth", if we replace surjective by "bijective" (resp. "injective"), then we get the definition of formally étale (resp. formally unramified).

Smooth base change 
Let S be a scheme and  denote the image of the structure map .

See also 
smooth algebra
regular embedding
Formally smooth map

References 
J. S. Milne (2012). "Lectures on Étale Cohomology"
J. S. Milne. Étale cohomology, volume 33 of Princeton Mathematical Series . Princeton University Press, Princeton, N.J., 1980.

Morphisms of schemes